The Bogazkoy archives are a collection of texts found on the site of the capital of the Hittite state, the city of Hattusas (now Bogazkoy in Turkey). They are the oldest extant documents of the state, and they are believed to have been created in the 2nd millennium BC. The archive contains approximately 25,000 tablets.

Content 
The archive contains royal annals, treaties, political correspondence, legal texts, inventory texts along with instructions, texts related to administration, mythological texts, and religious texts.

Language 
Most tablets were found to be written in the Hittite language. However, some of the tablets are written in Hurrian, and a few paragraphs of the tablets are written in Hattic. Akkadian is also a common language, though it is mashed with Hurrian and Hittite. Another language found in the texts is Assyrian. Given that the writing is mostly in cuneiform, there are Sumerograms interspersed throughout the texts regardless of language.

Discovery 
The Bogazkoy Archives were discovered in 1906 by Hugo Winckler and Theodore Makridi.

Studying 

 Hans Ehelohf wrote "Hans Ehelohf and the Bogazköy Archive in Berlin" after years of studying and translating.
 Hans Gustav Güterbock studied the archive and wrote multiple books about it for over 60 years.

References 

Clay tablets
Hittite texts

Bibliography